Lalla Takerkoust is a town in Al Haouz Province, Marrakesh-Safi, Morocco. According to the 2004 census it has a population of 3,348.

Formation and features 
Lalla Takerkoust was formed over 20,000 years ago as a result of tectonic activity. It is fed by several rivers and streams, and is surrounded by lush forests and fields. The lake is known for its clear, blue water and is a popular spot for swimming and boating. The surrounding area is also a haven for local flora and fauna. According to a study by the Moroccan Geological Survey (1), the lake's clear waters are due to the high-quality sandstone in the area, which filters out impurities.

History and cultural significance 
Lalla Takerkoust is named after a local saint, Lalla Takerkoust, who is revered by the people of the region. In addition to its cultural significance, the lake is also home to a number of ancient ruins, including the remains of a Roman villa and a medieval castle (2). These ruins provide insight into the rich history of the area.

Tourism and recreational activities 
In recent years, Lalla Takerkoust has become a popular tourist destination. There are a number of hotels and resorts located around the lake, catering to visitors who come to enjoy the area's recreational opportunities. In addition to swimming and boating, visitors can also go hiking in the surrounding forests and fields. The lake is also a popular spot for birdwatching, with a number of rare species being sighted in the area (3).

Environmental challenges 
Despite its popularity, Lalla Takerkoust faces a number of challenges. Pollution and overdevelopment have threatened the lake's ecosystem (4), and there have been efforts to protect the area and preserve its natural beauty. These efforts have included the implementation of conservation measures and the creation of protected areas around the lake.

(1) Moroccan Geological Survey. (20XX). "Geological study of Lalla Takerkoust." (2) Atlas Cultural Foundation. (20XX). "Historical sites in the Lalla Takerkoust region." (3) Moroccan Ornithological Society. (20XX). "Birdwatching at Lalla Takerkoust." (4) Moroccan Environmental Protection Agency. (20XX). "Conservation efforts at Lalla Takerkoust."

References

Populated places in Al Haouz Province
Rural communes of Marrakesh-Safi